Minacragides arnacis is a moth in the family Dalceridae. It was described by Harrison Gray Dyar Jr. in 1909. It is found in Colombia, Venezuela, Guyana, Suriname and Peru. The habitat consists of tropical moist, tropical premontane wet and tropical premontane moist forests.

The length of the forewings is 8–9 mm. Adults are on wing from February to August and November to December.

References

Moths described in 1909
Dalceridae